Jean Pierier of Mailly, called Jean de Mailly, was a Dominican chronicler working in Metz in the mid-13th century. In his Latin chronicle of the Diocese of Metz, Chronica universalis Mettensis, the fable of Pope Joan first appears in written form. He is also the compiler of the Abbreviatio in gestis sanctorum, a collection of legends about the saints which is an important forerunner of the Golden Legend.

Notes

Further reading
 Antoine Dondaine,  "Le dominicain Jean de Mailly et la Légende dorée", Archives d’histoire dominicaine, Le Saulchoir, 1946, p. 53-102.

Editions

Jean de Mailly, Abbreviatio in gestis et miraculis sanctorum. Supplementum hagiographicum. Ed. Giovanni Paolo Maggioni (Florence, SISMEL/Edizioni del Galluzzo, 2013). .

French chroniclers
Writers from Metz
13th-century French writers
Pope Joan